Müggel Lacus is one of a number of hydrocarbon seas and lakes found on Saturn's largest moon, Titan.

The lake is located at latitude 84.44°N and longitude 203.5° W on Titan's globe, and is composed of liquid methane and ethane, With a diameter of 170 km, it is the fifth largest of Titan's named lakes. It is named after Müggelsee in Berlin, Germany, the term being adopted by the IAU on Dec 3, 2013.

Notes

References

Lakes of Titan (moon)